The Boston College Eagles college football team represents Boston College in the Atlantic Division of the Atlantic Coast Conference (ACC). The Eagles compete as part of the NCAA Division I Football Bowl Subdivision. The program has had 40 head coaches, and two interim head coaches, since it began play during the 1893 season. Since December 2019, Jeff Hafley has served as head coach at Boston College.

Ten coaches have led Boston College in postseason bowl games: Frank Leahy, Denny Myers, Jack Bicknell, Tom Coughlin, Dan Henning, Tom O'Brien, Jeff Jagodzinski, Frank Spaziani, Steve Addazio, and Rich Gunnell.  O'Brien also won one conference championship as a member of the Big East Conference.

Joe Yukica, Bicknell, and O'Brien are the leaders in seasons coached 10 years each as head coach. O'Brien has the most all-time wins with 75 and Leahy has the highest winning percentage at 0.909. Arthur White and Joseph Courtney has the lowest winning percentage of those who have coached more than one game, with 0.000. Of the 40 different head coaches who have led the Eagles, Frank Cavanaugh, Gil Dobie, Leahy, and Mike Holovak have been inducted into the College Football Hall of Fame.

Key

Coaches

Notes

References

Boston College

Boston College Eagles football coaches